Roskilde Fjord is the fjord north of Roskilde, Denmark. It is a long branch of the Isefjord.

Cities
The cities Frederiksværk, Frederikssund, Jægerspris, Jyllinge and Roskilde (including Himmelev), (home to the famous Roskilde Festival), all have coastline at Roskilde Fjord. The image on this page shows the view of the fjord, as seen from Roskilde.

Viking Time
During the Viking time around 1000 AD the people of Roskilde decided to sink a number of their ships in the fjord at Skuldelev in order to prevent the Vikings from coming in and raiding. Originally five were discovered; but while extending the museum that houses these finds another nine were uncovered.

See also
 Roskilde Roklub

References

Fjords of Denmark
Geography of Frederikssund Municipality
Geography of Halsnæs Municipality